Mutilated currency is a term used by the United States Bureau of Engraving and Printing (BEP) to describe currency which is damaged to the point where it is difficult to determine the value of the currency, or where it is not clear that at least half of the note is present. Common causes of damage are fire, water damage, chemicals, explosives, damage caused by animals (including consumption of the currency) or damage from extended burying of the currency.

Replacement of mutilated currency is a free public service provided by the Bureau of Engraving and Printing. In general, mutilated U.S. paper currency can be submitted for evaluation. If it is determined that at least half of a bill is present, the BEP will redeem its face value. When there is less than 50% of a bill present, then if it can be identified as authentic U.S. currency, and that evidence demonstrates to the satisfaction of the Treasury Department that the missing portions have been destroyed, the face value of the bill will be redeemed in full.

Annually, the BEP handles approximately 30,000 claims, with currency redemptions valued at over $30 million.

The term is also used by the Bank of England in the United Kingdom, which will replace mutilated banknotes under a similar list of requirements and conditions to those used by the BEP.

Classification
Banknotes which are merely very dirty, or very worn out, but where the value is clear, are not considered mutilated and can be either spent as normal or traded in at any bank, from where they will eventually be processed out of circulation.

See also
 Contaminated currency

References

Redeem Mutilated Currency Bureau of Engraving and Printing
How to Submit a Mutilated Currency Claim  Bureau of Engraving and Printing

Banknotes of the United States